Max Geller is an American performance artist and human rights activist. Part of the Jewish left, Geller is an organizer and activist for Palestinian human rights, including the Boycott, Divestment and Sanctions movement (BDS).

Geller’s activism often employs non-traditional tactics, drawing on performance art, erudite references and irony to provoke social discomfort without expressing an explicit political agenda. His performance art, on the other hand, frequently relies on methods of activism, blurring the lines between art and politics. 

Most famously, Geller is the founder of #renoirsucksatpainting, a tongue-in-cheek social movement to remove the paintings of Auguste Renoir from museums around the world. He has frequently leveraged the Renoir Sucks at Painting project into media coverage for the BDS movement and other social causes.

Early life 
While in college, Geller and a friend conned their way into an appearance on the  television arbitration show Judge Mathis, which aired in 2005. Geller wrote a script for their disagreement, which the show presented at face value.

Anti-Zionist activism 
Geller is an active member of many groups organizing on behalf of Palestinian liberation, such as Students for Justice in Palestine (SJP), International Jewish Anti-Zionist Network (IJAN), and Jewish Voice for Peace (JVP), and has been a frequent contributor to a variety of conferences and journals.

Students for Justice in Palestine 
While Geller was a student at North Eastern Law School, he was president of the local chapter of Students for Justice in Palestine (SJP). In 2013, the group staged a walkout of a presentation by Israeli soldiers, and the school put them on administrative probation. SJP then delivered mock eviction letters to students, which resulted in the group's suspension. Geller defended the incident in an op-ed in the Boston Globe and an appearance on Democracy Now!.

New Orleans City Council BDS bill 
In 2017, Geller was involved with the New Orleans Palestinian Solidarity Committee (NOPSC), which lobbied the New Orleans City Council to pass a Boycott Divestment and Sanctions bill, in solidarity with the Palestinian cause. The bill passed, but was met with backlash from Zionist groups. The wording of the bill hadn’t explicitly named Israel, opting instead to target “human-rights violators,” but was nonetheless subjected to counter-lobbying by Zionist groups, who claimed the city council had been tricked by NOPSC. Shortly after passing the bill, the city council rescinded it.

Renoir Sucks at Painting 
In February 2015, Geller created the Instagram account @Renoir_sucks_at_painting, and began posting images of paintings by Pierre-Auguste Renoir, with captions criticizing both Renoir and the institutions that hang his art.

In May 2015, Renoir's great-great-granddaughter responded to one of the Instagram posts, entering into an argument with Geller, garnering some media attention. 

On October 5, 2015, Geller organized an anti-Renoir protest outside the Museum of Fine Arts Boston. The protest garnered criticism in the Boston Globe by Sebastian Smee, a Pulitzer prize-winning art critic, and Geller responded by publicly challenging Smee to a duel. The feud gained media attention, especially after a second protest outside the Metropolitan Museum of New York.

Geller continued to organize anti-Renoir protests at art museums in major cities around the country. After a protest at the Art Institute of Chicago, Geller was a guest on a local news station, where he expanded the focus of his movement from Renoir's paintings themselves to the misogyny and white supremacy of the canon at large. "At the end of the day," he said, "it’s about access, who has access to our museums... I think the Art Institute should sell some of these Renoirs...and instead buy some art that is painted by women or people of color."

References 

1984 births
Living people
21st-century American artists
21st-century American male artists
People from Brookline, Massachusetts
American performance artists
American human rights activists
Jewish anti-Zionism in the United States
Great Pyramid of Giza